"Asthena" aurantiaca is a moth in the family Geometridae first described by Louis Beethoven Prout in 1926. It is found on Western New Guinea.

Taxonomy
The species does not belong to the genus Asthena or even the tribe Asthenini, but has not been moved to another genus.

References

Moths described in 1926
Asthena
Moths of New Guinea